Larry Wade is an athlete.

Larry Wade may also refer to:

Larry Wade (musician), who worked with Billy Butler (singer)
Larry Wade, character in Life Without George

See also
Larry Wade Carrell